Planas is a surname. Notable people with the surname include:

Alfred Planas (born 1996), Spanish footballer
Carles Planas (born 1991), Spanish footballer
Carmen Planas (1914–1964), Filippino politician
Evelio Planas (born 1930), Cuban sprinter
Francisco Planas (1908-?), Cuban chess player
José Planas (born 1952), Spanish footballer 
José Planas Artés (1901–1977), Spanish football manager
José Planas Planas (born 1952), Spanish footballer
Juan-Carlos Planas (born 1970), American politician
Juan Batlle Planas (1911–1966), Argentine painter
Luis Planas (born 1952), Spanish labour inspector, diplomat and politician
Raúl Planas (1920–2001), Cuban singer and songwriter